is a stage of the Japanese language between 794 and 1185, which is known as the Heian period. The successor to Old Japanese, it is also known as Late Old Japanese. However, the term "Early Middle Japanese" is preferred, as it is closer to Late Middle Japanese (after 1185) than to Old Japanese (before 794).

Background

Old Japanese had borrowed and adapted the Chinese script to write Japanese. In Early Middle Japanese, two new scripts emerged: the kana scripts hiragana and katakana. That development simplified writing and brought about a new age in literature, with many classics such as The Tale of Genji, The Tale of the Bamboo Cutter, and The Tales of Ise.

Writing system
Early Middle Japanese was written in three different ways. It was first recorded in Man'yōgana, literally "ten thousand leaves borrowed labels", in reference to the Man'yōshū poetry anthology and the "borrowing" of the kanji characters as "labels" for the sounds of Japanese. Certain Chinese characters were borrowed to phonetically spell out Japanese sounds. Cursive handwriting gradually gave rise to the hiragana ("flat/simple borrowed labels") and Buddhist shorthand practices of using pieces of kanji to denote the sounds then developed into the katakana ("partial/piece borrowed labels").

It is worth noting that the man'yōgana in each cell only indicates one possible option for spelling each Japanese mora – in the table above, each chosen character is the direct origin of the corresponding modern hiragana.  See also Hentaigana for a fuller description of how multiple hiragana could be used to spell a single sound.  Also note that hiragana forms were not standardized at that time.

Although man'yōgana specify different kanji to represent voiced phonemes versus unvoiced phonemes, it is not until the Meiji period that we see standardized usage of the dakuten diacritic ゛ to explicitly mark voicing for hiragana and katakana.

Japan officially adopted simplified shinjitai ("new character forms") in 1946 as part of a round of orthographic reforms intended to improve literacy rates.  The so-called kyūjitai ("old character forms") are equivalent to Traditional Chinese characters, and these forms were the ones used in historical man'yōgana.  Modern transcriptions of classical texts are predominantly written in shinjitai. To avoid unnecessary ambiguity, quotes from classical texts would be written in kyūjitai.

Additionally, there are many spelling differences between Modern Japanese and Early Middle Japanese even for the same word. Details on these spelling rules are helpful for understanding historical kana  usage.

Phonology

Developments

Major phonological changes were characteristic of the period.

While these distinctions had begun to blur already at the end of the Old Japanese stage, they were completely lost in Early Middle Japanese. The final distinction to be lost was /ko1, go1/ vs. /ko2, go2/. For example, around the year 800 in very early Early Middle Japanese, in the same text /ko1/ was still represented by cursive 「」, while /ko2/ was represented by cursive 「」.

An increase in Chinese loanwords had a number of phonological effects:
 Introduction of palatal and labial consonant clusters such as /kw/ and /kj/
 Introduction of the uvular nasal 
 Length becoming a phonemic feature with the development of both long vowels and long consonants

The development of the uvular nasal and geminated consonants occurred late in the Heian period and brought about the introduction of closed syllables (CVC).

Phonetics

Vowels 
 : 
 : 
 : 
 : 
 :

Consonants

Phonetic realization

It may have varied depending on the following vowel, as in Modern Japanese.

Grammar
Syntactically, Early Middle Japanese was a subject-object-verb language with a topic-comment structure. Morphologically, it was an agglutinative language.

Phrase
A paragraph of Early Middle Japanese can be divided into the following units from large to small.
 Sentence ：A series of meaningful words divided from a paragraph by 「。」(period) .

(from The Tale of the Bamboo Cutter)

Romanization: ima wa mukasi, taketori no okina to ifu mono arikeri.

Modern Japanese translation：

English translation: Long before the present, it is said that there was someone called Old Man Bamboo Cutter.
It is to be noted that the noun「」("long past") is actually a predicate (means "is long past"). The predicate is not necessarily a verb in Early Middle Japanese.
 Phrase: A smallest unit naturally divided from the rest of a sentence by its meaning.
、。

The function of the auxiliary particle「」is to highlight the noun「」(now), which cannot be separately explained, so they should be in the same phrase. Similarly, the particle 「 」 represents the relation between the modifier「」("bamboo cutter", a compound noun) and the modified noun 「」(old man), like the preposition "of". Additionally, the particle 「」 connects the called name 「」(modified by 「」) to the verb「」( "call"), just like a preposition.  As for the auxiliary verb「」, it further clarifies that what the verb「」 ("be, exist") describes is a rumor about the past, but not a direct experience (i.e. ), so it should be included in the same phrase as  「」. In contrast, even if the verb 「」 does modify the noun「」 ("someone"), its meanning can still be realized naturally without any help from other words.
 Word: A smallest grammatical unit.

、。
Although 「」is a combination of the noun 「」and the verb 「」("get", infinitive), any compound noun, verb, or adjective should be considered as a single grammatical unit.

Classes of words
Words were classified as follows:
  stand alone as a phrase
 (Auxiliary) particle:  inflection. Has various functions like emphasis, acting like a postposition, hinting about the subject or expressing interrogative mood.
 Auxiliary verb:  inflection. Describes additional information of Yougen like tense, aspect, mood, voice, and polarity. Alternate descriptions include grammaticalized verb or Verb-like ending.
  stand alone as phrase
  inflection
  be subject
 Adverb(): mainly modifies Yougen.
 Conjunction
 Interjection
 Rentaisi: mainly modifies Taigen.
  be subject: Taigen (the words that are the main body of the sentence)
 Noun
 Pronoun
 Number
  inflection: Yougen (the words to predicate or to "use" other words)
 Verb
 Adjective: actually the stative verbs.
 Adjective verb: a different kind of "adjective", which is derived from a noun. Hence also referred to as adjectival noun in English.

Auxiliary particle 
(Auxiliary) Particles had various functions, and they can be classified as follows:

Case particle 
 「」  (ga) and 「」 (no) : "of, ...'s". It hints the present of subject, relation of modification between phrases or nouns.
 「」(wo) (accusative). Optional.
 「」(ni) (dative/locative).It had a wide range of functions ('to' or 'for' a person; 'by' an agent'; 'at' or 'to' a place; 'at' a time), and in some uses, especially when indicating time, it was optional.
 「」(yori) (ablative).
 「」(made) (terminative: 'until'; 'as far as').
 「」(to) (comitative: 'with'; essive 'as').
 「」(fe) (allative: 'to'). 「」 was derived from the noun「 」'vicinity; direction', which 「」 occasionally found in the location noun structure Noun + 「」 + Location Noun to mean 'near', or in the noun-deriving suffix 「」 (< 「」) in such words as  'beside the water' .
The nominative function was marked by the absence of a particle in main clauses and by the genitive particles in subordinate clauses. The dative/locative particle -ni was homophonous with the simple infinitive form of the copula -ni, with verbal suffixes supplies more complex case markers -ni-te ('at' a place) and -ni si-te or -ni-te ('by means of'). A number of particle + verb + -te sequences provided other case functions: -ni yori-te 'due to' (from yor- 'depend'), -ni tuki-te 'about, concerning' (from tuk- 'be attached'), and -to si-te 'as' (from se- 'do'). More complex structures were derived from genitive particle + Location Noun + appropriate case particle (typically locative -ni) and were used particularly to express spatial and temporal relations. Major location nouns were mafe 'front' (Noun-no mafe-ni 'in front of Noun'), ufe 'top' (Noun-no ufe-ni 'on top of Noun' ~ 'above Noun'), sita 'under' (Noun-no sita-ni 'under Noun), saki 'ahead' (Noun-no saki-ni 'ahead of Noun)', etc.

Conjunctive particle 
 Infinitive + 「」(te): 'and (then/so), when, because'. It usually expressed a close sequential link between the predicates that it connects. The subjects of the two verbs connected by「」 were usually the same.
 Realis + 「」(ba): 'and (then/so), when, because'. It usually expressed a looser sequential link between the predicates that it connected. The subject of both verbs connected by 「」 was usually different.
 Irrealis + 「」(ba): 'if...', It usually expressed a unreal condition.
 Irrealis + 「」(de): negative 'and', 'without ... ing', 'rather than ... ', derived from old infinitive of negative auxiliary verb「」(i.e. 「」) +  the particle 「」with sound change.
 Various forms + 「」 (do / domo): 'even if, even though'. Most yougens and auxiliary verbs took the conclusive form, bigrade verbs take the infinitive in earlier texts, r-irregular verbs took the attributive form,and some auxiliary verbs inflecting like adjective and negative auxiliary verbs「」also took the attributive.
 Infinitive + 「」 (tutu): 'while (at the same time)'.
 Infinitive of verb / stem of adjective + 「」(nagara): 'while, while still' or 'despite'.

Binding particle 
There was some special particles that limiting the inflectional form of yougen or auxiliary verb in the end of a sentence. These particles are called binding particles(). These limitation is called as binding rule().

Noted that the case particle「と」has the function to indicates a preceding quote, and a quote should be considered as an independent sentence to use the linking rule.

Susumu Ōno assumed that these binding particles was originally final particle. For example:Man'yōgana:  (from Man'yōshū, 265th)

Modern transliteration: Notice that 「」 is attributive(Due to the modification to the noun 「」). According to Susumu Ōno's assumption, if we want to emphasize the questioned noun(i.e.「」), we can invert the whole sentence as the following:Obviously, this gives birth to the binding rule. Since other binding particles can also consider as final particle in Old Japanese, this assumption is reasonable.

Verbs
Early Middle Japanese verb inflection was agglutinative. Most verbs were conjugated in 6 forms and could be combined with auxiliary verbs to express tense, aspect, mood, voice, and polarity. Several of the auxiliary verbs could be combined in a string, and each component determined the choice of form of the preceding component.

In Japanese there are many different yougens with the same pronunciation, or the same yougen has various meanings. To distinguish, modern transliteration uses Kanji to highlight these difference. For example, the Upper bigrade verbs「」means "get used to", but its also means "become familiar" which is represented by「」. Meanwhile, the quadrigrade verb「」has the same pronunciation with 「」but it actually means "become".

Conjugation
Early Middle Japanese inherited all eight verbal conjugations class from Old Japanese and added new one: Lower Monograde, but there's only 「」("kick by foot") classified as Lower Monograde in Early Middle Japanese.

Early Middle Japanese Verbs were divided into 5 class of regular conjugations:

Quadrigrade (yodan), Upper monograde (kami ichidan), Lower monograde (shimo ichidan), Upper bigrade (kami nidan), Lower bigrade (shimo nidan).

There were also 4 "irregular" conjugations:

K-irregular (kahen), S-irregular (sahen), N-irregular (nahen), R-irregular (rahen).

The conjugation of each is divided into 6 Inflectional forms():
 Irrealis (mizenkei, "imperfect form")
 Infinitive (ren'yōkei, "form linking to Yougen")
 Conclusive (shūshikei, "form to end [a sentence]")
 Attributive (rentaikei, "form linking to Taigen")
 Realis (izenkei, "perfect form")
 Imperative (meireikei,"form to give order")

The English names for the irrealis and the realis differ from author to author, including negative and evidential, imperfective and perfective, or irrealis and realis.

In following table, red part means , while blue part means .
 Inflectional form = +  ( =  + )
  = root consonant + real suffix (root consonant is unique to every verb.)

*Noted that most S-irregular is the combination of a noun and 「」, for example,  「」 is a combination of the noun 「」 ('date') and 「」.

The 「」 at the end of the imperative forms is optional, although exceedingly common.

The system of 9 conjugation classes appears to be complex. However, all nine conjugations can be subsumed into variations of two groups:
 the consonant-root verbs (quadrigrade, N-irregular and R-irregular verbs)
 the vowel-root verbs (others)
The irregularity of N-irregular verbs occurred only in the conclusive and the attributive, and as there are no quadrigrade verbs with n-roots, quadrigrade and N-irregular verb patterns may be treated as being in complementary distribution. Vowel-root verbs consist of bigrade verbs (the majority), a few monograde verbs (especially  'see' and  'sit'), the K-irregular verb  'come', and the S-irregular verb se- 'do' (or -ze- in some compounds). The difference between 'upper' and 'lower' bigrade or monograde verbs is whether the vowel at the end of the root was i or e. The difference between bigrade and monograde was whether in the conclusive, attributive and realis the initial u of the ending elided the vowel of the root or the vowel of the roots elides the initial u of the ending.

There are some questions about this arrangement of forms:
 The irrealis doesn't have an independent existence.
 The classical passive auxiliary verb 「」(「」in Old Japanese) is required to add after Irrealis  -a ending (i.e. quadrigrade, N-irregular and R-irregular), while the other classical passive auxiliary verbs 「」(「」in Old Japanese) requires irrealis  -a ending(i.e. other classes). This raises the assumption that this -a ending appears to be part of auxiliary verb, but not part of verb conjugation(The causative auxiliary verbs 「」 and 「」have same kind of requirement). According to this assumption, some scholars like Nicolas Tranter‬ doesn't agree with the existence of irrealis (they think it just a more primitive "stem" + -a ending from other words). But this assumption cannot explain irrealis  +  the particle 「」("if") represents a unreal condition(i.e. Subjunctive mood) in classical Japanese.  Actually, the term 「」 literally means "imperfect form", and it's named after this kind of usage. Additionally, this assumption cannot explain the modal auxiliary verb 「」("as someone though it should/could...") is also required to occur after irrealis.ex. Quadrigrade verb:  (The Tale of Genji)     Quadrigrade verb:  (Kokin Wakashū, 411th)     Lower Bigrade:  (The Pillow Book)     K-irregular:  (The Tale of the Bamboo Cutter)Noted that auxiliary verbs has its own inflection, for example, 「」 is the attributive of 「」, while「」 is the attributive of 「」. Additionally, both of their inflection are classified as lower bigrade.
 The infinitive had two functions, a linking function with another Yougen or auxiliary verb and a nominal function as a verb-noun, but these two functions have different pitch patterns.
 Generally, The Yougen or auxiliary verb occurred before conjunction particle「」 ("even if")  in the form of conclusive, but in some case of Old Japanese upper monograde verbs 「」 appears as infinitive before「」:
Man'yōgana:   之婆之婆等母 安加無伎禰加毛 (Man'yōshū, 4503th)
Modern transliteration:  
Probably, the monograde verb form that was used before 「」 was the earlier true conclusive form
 Additionally, before auxiliary verb 「」("should/could") generally the yougens should use the conclusive, while R-irregular verbs use the attributive instead (「」'be' at the end of a sentence but 「」'should be').  With endings such as 「」, there is strong evidence that they were originally the adverb 「」("certainly") and probably that a fusion of the root of the verb with the u-sound of the ending (* +  → ) has been interpreted as conclusive  +「」. This suggests that the apparently-anomalous u in 「」was part of the ending, not of the verb form.

Auxiliary verbs 
Auxiliary verbs are attached to the various forms of yougen, and a yougen could be followed by several such endings in a string. Auxiliary verbs are classified into many inflectional class like verbs.

Generally, To learn how to use a Auxiliary verb, we need to know (1)its inflection, (2)required forms of its preceding word, and (3) various function. The following is a detail example about 「」and 「」.

「」 requires to be preceded by irrealis  -a ending (i.e. quadrigrade, N-irregular and R-irregular), while 「」requires irrealis  -a ending(i.e. other classes).

They have 4 different functions.

 Representing passive mood: (The Pillow Book)translation: thing that  despised  people
 Representing slight respect to someone (by means of passive mood): (Tosa Nikki)translation: the thing that make the mother (author's wife) sad (i.e. representing slight respect to his own wife)
 Expressing possibility or potential. (The Tale of the Bamboo Cutter)translation:  bow and arrow  shoot (it down). (Noted that 「」is a modal auxiliary verb that requires to be preceded by irrealis)
 Representing a spontaneous voice(i.e. without volitional control). (Kokin Wakashū, 169th)translation: the sound of wind   me startled.(Noted that「」is attributive of perfect auxiliary verb「」. Since it's "bound" by binding particle「」, it has to occur as attributive.)

Rough classification 
Voice: 'passive' and 'causative':
 Consonant-stem verbs + 「」, vowel-stem verbs +  「」 (lower bigrade): passive voice; spontaneous voice (expressing lack of volitional control); honorific; potential ('can').
 Consonant-stem verbs + 「」, vowel-stem verbs +  「」 (lower bigrade): causative; honorific.
 Any verb +  「」 (lower bigrade): causative; honorific. It often occurs in Kanbun.
Tense/Aspect:
 Irrealis +「」 (R-irregular): progressive or perfect aspect. Only attached to quadrigrade or S-irregular verbs.
 Infinitive + 「」 (R-irregular): progressive or perfect aspect. Attached to any verbs.
 Infinitive + 「」 (N-irregular): perfective aspect.
 Infinitive + 「」 (lower bigrade): perfective aspect.
 Infinitive + 「」(unique conjugation): witnessed past tense.
 Infinitive + 「」 (R-irregular): unwitnessed past tense, or emotive assertion.
 Irrealis + 「」 (unique conjugation): counterfactual ('would have ... ed'). The combination 「」(Irrealis + ) expresses a counterfactual condition ('if ... had ... ed').
Mood:
 「」 (quadrigrade): tentative mood, expressing among other functions uncertainty ('maybe', 'shall I?'), intention ('I shall'), and hortative ('let's').
 「」 (siku-adjective): debitive mood, expressing 'can', 'should', or 'must'.
 「」 (R-irregular): hearsay mood.
Polarity:
 「」(unique conjugation): negative.
 「」 (uninflected): negative of the tentative mood (not seem...).
 「」(siku-adjective): negative of the debitive mood.

Adjectives
There were two types of adjectives: regular adjectives and adjectival nouns.

The regular adjective was subdivided into two types: those for which the adverbial form ended in 「-」(-ku)  and those that ended in 「-」(-siku).

The class of siku-adjectives included a few adjectives that had 「-」(-z), rather than 「-」:
They usually had 「-」 rather than 「-」 in its attributive form.

The -kar- and -sikar- forms were derived from the verb 「」"be, exists.":
Man'yōgana: 可奈之家牟 (Man'yōshū, 4333th)

Modern transliteration:
Since the axiliary verb of pass tentative mood「」needs to be preceded by infinitive, 「」is in infinitive form. And then naturally, the adjective 「」links to 「」 by infinitive. In Man'yōshū there's also example of 「-」.
Man'yōgana: 加奈之家理 (Man'yōshū, 793th)

Modern transliteration:
Since the auxiliary verb of unwitnessed past「」needs to be preceded by infinitive, 「」is in infinitive form.

So it's reasonable to assume that the infinitive suffix「-」is derived from 「-」that had lost its initial u-sound(i.e. sound change of infinitive suffix + 「」).  There's also similar example about other forms in Man'yōshū.

From above paragraph, we can realize that kari inflection is generally used to link to a auxiliary verbs(so it's also called 「」, "complement and auxiliary inflection"), but there's an example to show that the imperative form of kari inflection is an exception of this rule:  (Senzai Wakashū, 708th) That is, the imperative form of kari inflection is independently used without linking to any auxiliary verb.(However, it actually expresses a wish but not a order.)

Adjectival noun 

*The Japanese term  (seuzen, modern shōzen) is a borrowing from Middle Chinese word  with reconstructed pronunciation , meaning ‘quietly, softly’. Like  (seuzen), most tari adjectives are derived from Chinese borrowings.

The nari and tari inflections shared a similar etymology. The nari form was a contraction of the adverbial particle「」and the -r irregular verb「」"be, exist":  +  → , while the tari inflection was a contraction of the adverbial particle  and :  +  → .

Yougen in auxiliary form 
 「」 (R-irregular): progressive aspect. 'sit; live; be'.
 「」 (Upper monograde): progressive aspect. 'continue, …ing'.
 「」 (Quadrigrade): preparative aspect, expressing an action performed in readiness for some future action.  'put'.
 「」(Upper monograde): speculative aspect, expressing an action performed experimentally, to 'see' what it is like.  'see'.

Special inflection

Mi-inflection

Ku-inflection

See also
 Bungo

References

Sources 

 
 
 Frellesvig, Bjarke (2010). A history of the Japanese language. Cambridge: Cambridge University Press. .
 
 
 
 
 
 
 
 
 
 

Japanese language
Archaic Japanese language

Languages attested from the 8th century